Aenictus mentu is a species of brown army ant found in Sudan.

References

Dorylinae
Hymenoptera of Africa
Insects described in 1942